Fluopyram is a fungicide and nematicide used in agriculture. It is used to control fungal diseases such as gray mold (Botrytis), powdery mildew, apple scab, Alternaria, Sclerotinia, and Monilinia.  It is an inhibitor of succinate dehydrogenase.

In 2012, it was approved by the U.S. Environmental Protection Agency and in 2013 it was approved in the EU for use as an active ingredient in pesticides.

References

Fungicides

Nematicides

Trifluoromethyl compounds
Benzamides
Chloropyridines